Skagen Church (Danish: Skagen Kirke) is a church located in the historic town centre of Skagen, Denmark.

The Skagen area suffered from severe problems with sand drift up through the 18th century and in 1795 the sand covered old church had to be abandoned.  It was a brick church of considerable size dedicated to Saint Lawrence which dated from the beginning of the 15th century and located 2 km south-west of the town centre.

A new church was built in 1841 to the design of Christian Frederik Hansen. The church design was adapted and expanded in 1909-10 by Ulrik Plesner who also designed a number of other buildings in Skagen. Plesner collaborated with Thorvald Bindesbøll on the interior. Anne L. Hansen created interior decorations and a new colour scheme in 1989.

References

External links
 
 Official website

Buildings and structures in Skagen
Churches completed in 1910
Churches in the North Jutland Region
Buildings and structures in Frederikshavn Municipality
Churches in the diocese of Aalborg
Neoclassical church buildings in Denmark